LaLee's Kin: The Legacy of Cotton is a 2001 American documentary film directed by Deborah Dickson, Susan Froemke and Albert Maysles. It was nominated for Best Documentary Feature at the 74th Academy Awards.

Content
LaLee's Kin: The Legacy of Cotton has two storylines, both of which show the impoverished life of residents in the American South. The documentary draws the connection—a vicious cycle—between poverty and the lack of education opportunity for black people living in the Mississippi Delta, over 150 years after the abolition of slavery.

Laura Lee (LaLee) Wallace, a great-granddaughter of a slave, is an illiterate 62-year-old woman who has been living all her life in Tallahatchie County, one of the poorest in the United States. She has one surviving son, nine daughters, 38 grandchildren, and 15 great-grandchildren. Her daily living consists of many difficulties: LaLee has to raise many of her grandchildren, her son is continually put in prison, and most of her daughters have to leave Tallahatchie County searching for work. LaLee's life is heavily dependent on the cotton industry; she struggles to earn a living by cooking lunches for people working in local cotton factories.

Reggie Barnes is the superintendent of the West Tallahatchie school system, which is put on probation by the state due to poor standardized test results. The school has the hardship of trying to educate the children of illiterate parents. If it fails to raise the annual standardized test scores, the school will be taken over by the state

Production and release
The documentary is noted for using the direct cinema techniques, thus creating a "more intimate and confronting work."

The film was shown at the  Seattle International Film Festival (May 24–June 17, 2001) and participated in the Documentary Competition at the Sundance Film Festival in Park City, Utah (January 18–28, 2001). LaLee's Kin: The Legacy of Cotton was released theatrically in New York City on June 22, 2001. The film was released on DVD in 2010.

Reception

Critical reaction
LaLee's Kin: The Legacy of Cotton received highly positive reviews by the critics. The documentary received a score of 78 out of 100 at Metacritic based on 5 reviews. The New York Times'''s critic A. O. Scott praised the film as "an exemplary work of cinéma vérité that allows its subjects to speak for themselves." TV Guide rated the film 3 out of 4 stars. Meanwhile, Variety magazine considered the film "an especially humanistic entry in the Maysles canon."

Nominations and awardsLaLee's Kin: The Legacy of Cotton'' garnered a nomination for Best Documentary Feature at both the 74th Academy Awards and the 17th Independent Spirit Awards. Veteran documentarian Albert Maysles won the "Excellence in Cinematography Award" at the Sundance Film Festival.

References

External links
 
 LaLee's Kin: The Legacy of Cotton at Maysles Films

2001 films
2001 documentary films
American documentary films
Documentary films about African Americans
Documentary films about education in the United States
Education in Tallahatchie County, Mississippi
Films set in Mississippi
Documentary films about Mississippi
2000s English-language films
2000s American films
Cotton industry in the United States